Dupljane may refer to:

 Dupljane (Vladičin Han), a village in Serbia
 Dupljane (Negotin), a village in Serbia